Periodic elections for the Tasmanian Legislative Council were held on 7 May 2011. The three seats up for election were Launceston, held by retiring independent MLC Don Wing; Murchison, held by independent MLC Ruth Forrest; and Rumney, held by Labor MLC Lin Thorp. These seats were last contested in 2005.

On the same day, a by-election was held for the seat of Derwent following the resignation of Labor MLC Michael Aird. Derwent was last contested in 2009.

Launceston
The seat of Launceston, previously known as Paterson, had been held by Don Wing since 1982; the last time the seat was up for election, Wing was re-elected unopposed. His retirement left the seat vacant. One of the stronger Liberal areas in Tasmania, that party selected Sam McQuestin, the state party president, as their candidate. The Labor Party selected Steve Bishop, while Launceston Alderman Rosemary Armitage and businesswoman Lou Clark were independent candidates.

Murchison
Sitting independent MLC Ruth Forrest was the sole nominee for the election in Murchison, which she had held since 2005. She was thus declared re-elected unopposed.

Rumney
Rumney had been held since 1999 by Labor MLC and Children's Services Minister Lin Thorp, who was elected in 2005 with a primary vote majority. The only party to preselect an opponent was the Greens, who nominated schoolteacher Penelope Ann; however, Tony Mulder, an independent candidate, was a past candidate for the Liberal Party. Other independents included former Children's Commissioner Paul Mason, former Labor member Cate Clark, and business analyst and serial candidate John Forster.

Derwent by-election
Labor MLC and Treasurer Michael Aird had held the seat of Derwent since 1995, and the seat had been in Labor hands since 1979. Aird announced his retirement on 9 November 2010 and formally resigned from the Legislative Council on 6 December 2010. As his replacement, Labor preselected Craig Farrell, the Deputy Mayor of Derwent Valley Council. The Greens selected Phillip Bingley, while independent candidates included retailer Ray Williams, Glenorchy Alderman Jenny Branch (a former Liberal Party candidate), and Central Highlands Councillor Deirdre Flint.

References

2011 elections in Australia
Elections in Tasmania
2010s in Tasmania
May 2011 events in Australia